Parnops is a genus of leaf beetles in the subfamily Eumolpinae. It contains four species, which are distributed in the southern part of Central Asia and in Iran, Mongolia and northern China.

Species
 Parnops atriceps Pic, 1903 – China (Xinjiang)
 Parnops glasunowi Jacobson, 1894
 Parnops glasunowi ferghanicus Lopatin, 1976 – Kyrgyzstan
 Parnops glasunowi glasunowi Jacobson, 1894 – China (Gansu, Hebei, Liaoning, Inner Mongolia, Shaanxi, Shanxi, Xinjiang), Iran, Tajikistan, Turkmenistan, Uzbekistan
 Parnops ordossana Jacobson, 1910 – China (Inner Mongolia)
 Parnops vaillanti Pic, 1945 – China (Xinjiang)

References

Eumolpinae
Chrysomelidae genera
Beetles of Asia
Taxa named by Georgiy Jacobson